Mountain View High School or Mountainview High School may refer to:

India
 Mountain View High School (Karnataka), Chikmagalur, Karnataka, India

New Zealand
 Mountainview High School (New Zealand), Timaru, New Zealand

United States
 Mountain View High School (Pima County, Arizona), Tucson, Arizona
 Mountain View High School (Mesa, Arizona), Mesa, Arizona
 Mountain View High School (Arkansas), Mountain View, Arkansas
 Mountain View High School (El Monte, California), El Monte, California
 Mountain View High School (Mountain View, California), Mountain View, California

 Mountain View High School (Colorado), Loveland, Colorado
 Mountain View High School (Georgia), Lawrenceville, Georgia
 Mountain View High School (Idaho), Meridian, Idaho
 Mountain View High School (Bend, Oregon), Bend, Oregon

 Mountain View High School (Texas), El Paso, Texas
 Mountain View High School (Utah), Orem, Utah
 Mountain View High School (Shenandoah County, Virginia), Quicksburg, Virginia
 Mountain View High School (Stafford, Virginia), Stafford, Virginia
 Mountain View Alternative High School, Centreville, Virginia
 Auburn Mountainview High School, Auburn, Washington
 Mountain View High School (Washington), Vancouver, Washington
 Mountain View High School (Wyoming), Mountain View, Wyoming

See also
 Mount View High School (disambiguation)
 Mountain View Elementary School (disambiguation)
 Mountain View (disambiguation)